Joseph Merrill Hoeffel III (born September 3, 1950) is an American author and politician. A Democrat, Hoeffel was a member of the United States House of Representatives from 1999 to 2005, representing Pennsylvania's 13th congressional district. He also served multiple terms on the Montgomery County Board of Commissioners, and from 1977–84, was a member of the Pennsylvania House of Representatives. A native of Philadelphia, he is a graduate of Boston University and Temple University School of Law.

Hoeffel was an unsuccessful candidate for the United States Senate in 2004, and for Governor of Pennsylvania in 2010.

Background 
Hoeffel was born in Philadelphia, Pennsylvania, to Joseph and Eleanore Hoeffel. After graduating from William Penn Charter School in 1968, he attended Boston University and earned a Bachelor of Arts degree in English in 1972. He served in the Army Reserves from 1970 to 1976.

He first became involved in politics during the 1972 presidential election, when his opposition to the Vietnam War led him to support Senator George McGovern. In 1973, he became a legislative aide to Representative Gerry Studds of Massachusetts, for whom Hoeffel did research on foreign overfishing.

Political career

After working for Studds for a year, Hoeffel challenged four-term Republican incumbent Daniel Beren for a seat in the Pennsylvania House of Representatives, representing the Abington-based 153rd district, in 1974. He was defeated by 1,505 votes. From 1975 to 1976, he was the Central Montgomery County administrator for the American Red Cross.

Hoeffel successfully ran again for state House in 1976, after Beren decided to not seek re-election. He was the first Democrat to represent the Abington area since World War I. He served from 1977 to 1985. The first bill he passed as a state legislator was a campaign reform proposal in 1978 improving financial disclosure.

In 1984, he gave up his seat to run for the United States House of Representatives in the 13th congressional district, but was defeated by longtime Republican incumbent Lawrence Coughlin. Hoeffel sought a rematch in 1986, and was defeated again. He received his Juris Doctor degree from Temple University School of Law in 1986, and then worked at the Norristown law firms of Wright, Manning, Kinkaid & Oliver (1987–90) and Kane, Pugh & Driscoll (1990–91).

After several years out of politics, Hoeffel won a seat on the Montgomery County Commission in 1991. In a surprise to the political establishment, Hoeffel supported Republican Mario Mele for Commission chairman over Jon Fox.

Career in Congress
In 1996, Hoeffel made a third run at Congress, taking on his former colleague on the Montgomery County Commission, Jon Fox, now a first-term Congressman. That year, Fox hung onto his seat by an 84-vote margin. However, in 1998, in his fourth attempt, Hoeffel broke through. Hobbled by a tough Republican primary and the fallout from the impeachment process against President Bill Clinton, Fox could not hang on a second time. Hoeffel won by more than 5,000 votes.  Hoeffel became only the second Democrat to represent the Montgomery County-based district in 86 years.

He won re-election twice, though not without difficulty.  In 2000 he won an expensive race against Republican State Senator Stewart Greenleaf, who represented most of the eastern portion of the congressional district. He thus became the first Democrat to serve more than one term in the district in decades. In 2002, he defeated wealthy ophthalmologist Melissa Brown by less than expected; the 13th had been made somewhat more Democratic with the addition of part of Philadelphia. During the 2002 election, Hoeffel's website was praised as among the best of the 2002 election cycle.

In Congress, Hoeffel was a member of two House committees: International Relations and Transportation and Infrastructure.

On July 20, 2004, Hoeffel became the third sitting U.S. Congressman in one week, following Charles Rangel and Bobby Rush, to be arrested for trespassing while protesting alleged human rights violations in front of the Sudanese Embassy. U.S. Senator Arlen Specter, Hoeffel's Republican opponent in the 2004 U.S. Senate race, criticized the arrest as a publicity stunt.

Rather than holding onto his seat, Hoeffel decided in 2004 to run for the U.S. Senate against incumbent Republican Arlen Specter. In the election held on November 2, 2004, Hoeffel was defeated by more than ten points to Specter, 53%-42%, and only carried four counties.  Hoeffel was at a considerable disadvantage because of Specter's popularity in the Philadelphia suburbs.

After Congress
Hoeffel endorsed Bob Casey, Jr. for the United States Senate in 2006; Casey defeated incumbent Republican Rick Santorum by a wide margin.

Hoeffel announced that he would run for lieutenant governor in March 2006 against incumbent Catherine Baker Knoll, but dropped out of the race a day later. Governor Ed Rendell convinced Hoeffel that the Democratic ticket needed geographic balance; Knoll is from Allegheny County; Rendell is from Philadelphia. The Democratic Committees of Bucks and Chester Counties had overwhelmingly voted to endorse him over Knoll.

In July 2006, Rendell named Hoeffel the Deputy Secretary of the Department of Community and Economic Development where he would oversee the International Commerce Office of the DCED.

In February 2007, Hoeffel announced that he would resign his post in order to run for the Montgomery County Commission with incumbent Ruth Damsker.  Hoeffel's and Damsker's opponents were incumbent Jim Matthews and district attorney Bruce Castor.

Hopes were high that the Democrats could win majority control on the commission due to party gains in the county and a fractured county Republican party.  Hoeffel finished second, behind Castor, winning a seat on the Commission, but his running mate fell short, keeping control in Republican hands.  However, thanks to a deal with Matthews, Hoeffel became Vice Chairman of the Commission, in exchange for supporting Matthews' bid to become Chairman over Castor.

2010 gubernatorial campaign

On September 20, 2009, Hoeffel announced that he would seek the Democratic nomination for Governor of Pennsylvania. During the campaign, he called for the introduction of a graduated income tax for the state, supported the implementation of a statewide single-payer health care program, stressed his pro-choice position on abortion and opposition to school vouchers, and distinguished himself as the only candidate supporting the legalization of same-sex marriage.

He received endorsements from NOW, the Stonewall Democrats, the United Auto Workers, and various local affiliates of Democracy for America.

In the May 18, 2010 primary, he placed fourth out of four candidates, receiving 130,799 votes, or 12.7% of the total votes cast, and winning Montgomery County, though without a majority.

Subsequent political career
Within days of losing the 2010 primary for governor, Hoeffel announced he would seek another term as county commissioner in 2011. He followed Matthews, who also initially announced his intention to seek re-election, in withdrawing from the contest in early 2011 and was not renominated by his party.

A subsequent grand jury report  found questionable behavior on Hoeffel's part for his participation in discussing county business at private breakfast meetings held with Matthews and senior aides–an alleged violation of state Sunshine laws. However, unlike Matthews, who was later alleged to have perjured himself while testifying to the grand jury, Hoeffel was never charged with criminal wrongdoing.

On March 10, 2018, Hoeffel announced that he will seek to retake his old congressional seat, now renumbered as the 4th District. A court-ordered remap had cut out the district's share of Philadelphia. Although the new 4th was geographically similar to the area he had represented for his first two terms, he finished a distant third, with only 11 percent of the vote, well behind State Representative and fellow Abingdon resident Madeleine Dean.

Political positions

Education
According to his campaign website, Hoeffel favors expanded funding for early childhood education programs, drop-out prevention and drop-out reengagement programs and centers, and basic education for school board members. He favors keeping the current defined benefit pension plan for all teachers over a change to a defined contribution plan for new hires. Hoeffel would continue the school funding formula implemented by Governor Ed Rendell to reduce dependence on local property taxes to fund schools.

Labor
Hoeffel has a lifetime 97% rating from the AFL–CIO and is endorsed by several labor unions in the Philadelphia area.

Abortion
Hoeffel has a 100% rating from NARAL Pro-Choice America.  He is endorsed by former NARAL Pro-Choice America President Kate Michelman, and by the Pennsylvania chapter of the National Organization for Women

LGBT rights
He favors amending Pennsylvania's Hate Crimes Law to include crimes targeting LGBT people and supports full marriage rights.

Writing 
Hoeffel's book about his vote for the Iraq War, The Iraq Lie: How the White House Sold the War, was published in 2014 by Progressive Press. Hoeffel provides a first-person account of the Congressional debate on the Iraq War Resolution, and argues that the Bush White House misled Congress and the country and took the United States to war in Iraq under false pretenses. Hoeffel suggests intelligence reforms to prevent such deceptions from happening again.

Hoeffel's second book, Fighting for the Progressive Center in the Age of Trump, was published in August 2017 by Praeger. In this book, Hoeffel argues that "progressives must fight for the political center of our civic arena with policies that are both socially liberal and fiscally responsible if we want to win the battle for public support against Donald Trump." The book is a mix of policy prescriptions which reject partisan extremes and rigid ideologies, with numerous anecdotes from 25 years serving in elected office at the county, state and federal levels.

Personal life
He has been married for 26 years to Francesca Hoeffel. They live in Abington Township, a suburb of Philadelphia, and have two children. His grandfather, also named Joseph M. "Joe" Hoeffel, served as coach of the Green Bay Packers in 1921.

Congressional electoral history
{| class="wikitable" style="margin:0.5em ; font-size:95%"
|+ : Results 1996–2002
!|Year
!
!|Democrat
!|Votes
!|Pct
!
!|Republican
!|Votes
!|Pct
!
!|3rd Party
!|Party
!|Votes
!|Pct
!
!|3rd Party
!|Party
!|Votes
!|Pct
!
|-
|1996
|
| |Joseph M. Hoeffel
| align="right" |120,220
| |49%
|
| |Jon D. Fox
| align="right" |120,304
| |49%
|
| |Thomas Patrick Burke
| |Libertarian
| align="right" |4,930
| align="right" |2%
|
| |Bill Ryan
| |Natural Law
| align="right" |525
| align="right" |<1%
|
|-
|1998
|
| |
| align="right" |95,105
| |52%
|
| |Jon D. Fox
| align="right" |85,915
| |47%
|
| |Thomas Patrick Burke
| |Libertarian
| align="right" |3,470
| align="right" |2%
|
|
|
|
|
|
|-
|2000
|
| |Joseph M. Hoeffel
| align="right" |146,026
| |53%
|
| |
| align="right" |126,501
| |46%
|
| |Ken Cavanaugh
| |Libertarian
| align="right" |4,224
| align="right" |2%
|
|
|
|
|
|
|-
|2002
|
| |Joseph M. Hoeffel
| align="right" |107,945
| |51%
|
| |
| align="right" |100,295
| |47%
|
| |John P. McDermott
| |Constitution
| align="right" |3,627
| align="right" |2%
|
|
|
|
|
|

{| class="wikitable" style="margin:0.5em ; font-size:95%"
|+ Pennsylvania Senator (Class III): 2004 Results
!|Year
!
!|Democrat
!|Votes
!|Pct
!
!|Republican
!|Votes
!|Pct
!
!|3rd Party
!|Party
!|Votes
!|Pct
!
!|3rd Party
!|Party
!|Votes
!|Pct
!
|-
|2004
|
| |
| align="right" |2,334,126
| |42%
|
| |
| align="right" |2,925,080
| |53%
|
| |James Clymer
| |Constitution
| align="right" |220,056
| align="right" |4%
|
| |Betsy Summers
| |Libertarian
| align="right" |79,263
| align="right" |1%
| |*

*Write-in and minor candidate notes:  In 2004, write-ins received 580 votes.

References

External links

|-

|-

|-

|-

|-

1950 births
Living people
Democratic Party members of the Pennsylvania House of Representatives
Montgomery County Commissioners (Pennsylvania)
Boston University College of Arts and Sciences alumni
Temple University Beasley School of Law alumni
People from Montgomery County, Pennsylvania
Democratic Party members of the United States House of Representatives from Pennsylvania
William Penn Charter School alumni
21st-century American politicians